Abortion in Austria has been fully legalized since 1 January 1975. Elective abortions can be performed in hospitals for women during the first three months from the beginning of the pregnancy. Abortions can be performed later if there is a physical or mental health threat to the pregnant woman, if there is an incurable problem with the development of the fetus, or if the patient is under the age of 14.

There is no punishment for doctors who choose not to perform abortions based on personal or religious convictions, except if the life of the woman is at stake and a lack of abortion causes the woman's death. The 1975 law protects doctors who choose not to perform abortions. There are very few abortion clinics or hospitals with abortion capability outside major cities, making it next to impossible to have an abortion in rural areas. Abortions are not paid for by the government health system.

In 2000, the abortion rate was 1.4 abortions per 1000 women aged 15-44 years.

Abortion in Liechtenstein, which borders Austria, remains illegal. Some women who choose to terminate an unwanted pregnancy cross the border into Austria to undergo the procedure.

History 
For more than a century, the Austrian abortion policy was largely governed by the 1852 legislation that criminalized abortion. Both the woman willingly attempting to end her pregnancy and the individual conducting the abortion faced up to five years in jail. However, there were a few legal exceptions. If the pregnant woman's life were in urgent danger or her bodily and mental health would be significantly harmed by prolonging the pregnancy, there was no penalty if the pregnancy was the result of rape and use of force. Only the medical practitioner was permitted to conduct the abortion in these rare situations. 

The Austrian Social Democratic Party, a party with a long history of women's movement activity, led the charge to relax nineteenth-century abortion laws. Female social democratic MPs proposed legalizing abortion during the first trimester of pregnancy in 1920. Party officials brought forth a fresh proposal in 1924 to allow abortion for medical, social, or eugenic grounds and recommendations for more excellent sex education and the construction of information centers. The abortion issue received a whole paragraph in the 1926 party platform.

References 

Austria
Healthcare in Austria
Austria
Women in Austria